Cinnamomum cebuense, the Cebu cinnamon or, locally, kaningag, is a species of cinnamon endemic to Cebu Island, Philippines.  It was first discovered in Cantipla, Cebu in mid-1980s and described by Kostermans in 1986. The tree is endemic to the island of Cebu but several trees have been found in neighboring Camotes Islands and Siquijor Island.

References

cebuense
Trees of the Philippines
Critically endangered plants
Endemic flora of the Philippines
Flora of the Visayas
Plants described in 1986
Taxa named by André Joseph Guillaume Henri Kostermans